The Royal Guernsey Light Infantry was an infantry regiment of the British Army that was formed from the Royal Guernsey Militia in 1916 to serve in World War I. They fought as part of the British 29th Division. Of the 2,280 men, most of whom came from Guernsey, who fought on the Western Front with the RGLI, 327 were killed and 667 were wounded.

Many Guernsey men had already volunteered for regiments in the British Army before the RGLI was formed. The RGLI was created because there was no Guernsey-named regiment to underline the island's devotion to the Crown.

The regimental motto, Diex Aïx, derives from the battle cry used by the Duke of Normandy 1,000 years earlier.

The regiment was disbanded in 1919 but the regimental tradition lives on in the Guernsey Army Cadet Force (Det.) Light Infantry, who, although they do not wear the RGLI cap badge, still keep alive the history of the Regiment within the detachment.

History

1916
17 December
 Royal Guernsey Light Infantry established. (Royal Guernsey Militia suspended for the duration of the war)
 Most men from the Militia volunteered to join the RGLI, others including a few civilians, were conscripted.

1917
Training in Guernsey at Fort George, L'Ancresse and Beaucamps
1 June
To England – Bourne Park Camp near Canterbury for advanced infantry training. Forming part of 202nd Brigade, 67th Division.
July
2nd (Reserve) Battalion formed to receive recruits and train them as replacements for casualties in the 1st Battalion RGLI.
September
Soldiers sent on a final leave
26 September
The RGLI 1st Service Battalion (44 Officers and 964 other ranks) boarded trains to Southampton and onwards to France.
 2 Officers and 53 other ranks returned to Guernsey to join the 2nd Battalion, too young, too old or unfit for France.
27 September
Land at Le Havre and travel by Forty-and-eights train to Stoke Camp, Proven.
October
RGLI take their place in 86th Brigade, part of the 29th Division
9–14 October
Battle of Poelcappelle (Part of Third Battle of Ypres, or ‘Passchendaele’). After this, rest and training for Cambrai.
October–November
Training for planned Battle of Cambrai with Tanks.
20 November – 3 December
Battle of Cambrai, where the RGLI's role was to go through the Hindenburg Line after the first wave and take 'Nine Wood' to the north of Marcoing. This went according to plan, with few casualties and they then moved into Marcoing and on to the front line at Masnières. The Guernseymen found themselves defending the small town of Les Rues Vertes against a huge and determined German counter-attacks on 30 November, pushed back they retook the village twice in heavy hand to hand fighting that lasted two days. They suffered heavy casualties, with nearly 40% of the regiment either killed, injured or missing during the battle, but only withdrew when ordered to by the high command.
A number of the wounded found themselves returned to Guernsey, to be cared for at the Victoria Military Hospital in Amherst or the Convalescent Hospital at Les Touillets, Castel.
After this, rest, refitting, training and a search for replacements. The shortage of men available from Guernsey resulted in the RGLI entering 1918 with 50% of the men being non-Guernsey born.

1918
18–26 January
RGLI went back into the front line at Sint-Jan (north east of Ypres). After this, work parties, training.
8–29 March
In battle zone, taking turns in the front line at Poelcappelle.
3–7 April
In front line, Passchendaele sector. When out of the line, employed in trenching and draining.

Pulled out of the front line, the 503 officers and men were hurried by lorry to Vieux-Berquin in the Lys area where a German offensive had broken through.
10–14 April
Battle of the Lys, east of Hazebrouck. German 6th Army under Von Quast smashes 5 miles through allied lines. The RGLI is bussed south to help stem the German advance. Hopelessly outnumbered, but holding the Germans in a fighting retreat from Le Doulieu to near Merris, the Battalion suffer an appalling 80% casualties rate. The RGLI is relieved by the Australian 1st Division. Field Marshall Douglas Haig, 1st Earl Haig wrote in his despatches, which was published in the London Gazette on 21 October 1918: "After very heavy fighting, in the course of which the 1st Battalion Royal Guernsey Light Infantry, 29th Division, Major-General D.E. Cayley C.M.G. commanding the division, did gallant service....."
The fighting strength was now less than 110 officers and men.
27 April
The RGLI, withdrawn from the 29th Division and 86th Brigade, become GHQ troops well to the rear in Ecuires where they became guard troops for General Haig's H.Q. at Montreuil, Pas-de-Calais for the rest of the war and beyond. The Army headquarters was an enormous administrative body, divided into five departments staffed with a wide variety of personnel. Haig lived at a small Chateau 'Beaurepaire',  SE of the town on the D138. 
27 November 
King George V, accompanied by Haig, made a triumphant passage through Montreuil on his way to Paris.

1919

5 April
Haig leaves Montreuil and the headquarters ceases to operate as such.

21–22 May
Many of the remaining members of the RGLI sailed back to Guernsey on the "SS Lydia". They left behind 327 graves bearing their cap badge.

Honours and awards

Orders and medals

 Order of St. Michael and St. George (Companion) (3rd Class) 
T. L. de Havilland, Lieutenant Colonel 

 Royal Victorian Order (5th Class)
N. R. Ingrouille, Lieutenant 

 Military Cross
T, Hutchesson, Captain (T/Major) 
F. de M. Laine, Lieutenant 
H. A. Le Bas, Lieutenant (T/Captain) 
E. J. Stone, 2nd Lieutenant 
H. E. K. Stranger, 2nd Lieutenant 

 Distinguished Conduct Medal
W. H. Budden, 569 Acting Sergeant  
H. L. James, 586 Sergeant  
W. J. Le Poidevin, 590 Sergeant 

 
Military Medal
1249 Pte E Le Moigne, RGLI survived the war, and returned on the SS Lydia in May 1919. He had been awarded a 29th Divisional Parchment for Gallant Conduct and Devotion to Duty. 
T. R. Robin, 841 Private  
C. H. Yeaghers, 610 Private  
J. Sealley, 843 Corporal  
W. Gannicott, 335 Corporal  
W. T. Gregg, 87 Private  
G, Ruaux, 458 Private 

 Médaille militaire (France)
J. Sealley, 843 Corporal 

 Mentioned in Despatches
(Despatch from Sir Douglas Haig to the Secretary of State for War) 
T. L. de Havilland, Lieutenant Colonel  
E. A. Dorey, Lieutenant  
C.W. Hockey, 438 Lance Corporal  
H. Jones, Lieutenant  
C. C. Machon, 226 Lance Corporal  
W. T. Robinson, 1131 Lance Corporal

Battle Honours
In February 1925, in accordance with General Order No 5034 The London Gazette published a complete list of Battle Honours awarded for the Great War.

In General Orders, 1928, "Honours awarded to Militia Corps for services previous to the Great War shall pass to the reconstituted Militia Regiment and shall be emblazoned on all Regimental Standards, Guidons or Colours"

Following the disbandment of the Royal Guernsey Light Infantry in 1919, the 1st Battalion Royal Guernsey Militia were granted the following Battle Honours:
 Ypres 1917 (for militia men serving with Royal Irish regiments)
 Passchendaele 
 Cambrai 1917 
 Lys
 Estaires
 Hazebrouck
 France and Flanders 1917–1918.

The Colours of the RGLI are hung in the Town Church, Guernsey

Poetry

See ye Masnières canal a'flood
And where yon green graves lay?
There Norman warriors fled to their God
Ne'er more to glimpse the day.
But writ there, first, a name in blood-
Norman Ten Hundred.

At Doulieu, the night birds flit
Across yon blue-grey water.
And at dusk ghost warriors sit-
Wraiths of a fearsome slaughter.
There too in blood the name is writ-
Norman Ten Hundred.

And thus there the battle's flame
Laid men out fast and low,
So young Sarnia died, but Fame
Cast o'er their graves its glow,
And honours wove about the name
Norman Ten Hundred.

(From Blicq, A Stanley, Norman Ten Hundred, Guernsey Press, 1920)

Commemoration

The Royal Guernsey Light Infantry Charitable Trust was formed in 2016 to commemorate the regiment. Its joint patrons are Lt Governor Vice Admiral Sir Ian Corder and the Bailiff of Guernsey, Richard McMahon. The Trust placed memorials at Les Rues Vertes, France and St Peter Port, Guernsey on the centenary of key RGLI events in 2017 & 2018. The Trust twinned the town of Masnières with St Peter Port in 2019.

See also
 Royal Guernsey Militia
 Royal Militia of the Island of Jersey

References

 Blicq, A Stanley, Norman Ten Hundred, Guernsey Press, 1920
 Parks, Major Edwin, Diex Aix: God Help Us – The Guernseymen who marched away 1914–1918, States of Guernsey, 1992

External links

The Channel Islands and the Great War Study Group
 RGLI page includes Nominal Roll, Casualty Lists, War Diary
 Transcript of RGLI War Diary
 Web Site

Other Links

 Guernsey Museum article on the RGLI
 R.G.L.I. regimental badge
 RGLI page at Long, Long Trail site
 Army cadet forces in Channel Islands
Royal Guernsey Light Infantry Regimental Museum
R.G.L.I. Nominal roll of service
 The Royal Guernsey Light Infantry Charitable Trust

Infantry regiments of the British Army
History of Guernsey
History of the Channel Islands
Military units and formations established in 1916
Military units and formations disestablished in 1919
British light infantry
Regiments of the British Army in World War I